Peter Press Maravich (June 22, 1947 – January 5, 1988), known by his nickname Pistol Pete, was an American professional basketball player. Maravich was born in Aliquippa, Pennsylvania, part of the Pittsburgh metropolitan area, and raised in the Carolinas. Maravich starred in college at Louisiana State University's Tigers basketball team; his father Press Maravich was the team's head coach. 

Pete Maravich is the all-time leading NCAA Division I scorer with 3,667 points scored and an average of 44.2 points per game. All of his accomplishments were achieved before the adoption of the three-point line and shot clock, and despite being unable to play varsity as a freshman under then-NCAA rules. He played for three National Basketball Association (NBA) teams until injuries forced his retirement in 1980 following a 10-year professional basketball career. 

One of the youngest players ever inducted into the Naismith Memorial Basketball Hall of Fame, Maravich was considered to be one of the greatest creative offensive talents ever and one of the best ball handlers of all time. He died suddenly at age 40 during a pick-up game in 1988 as a consequence of an undetected heart defect.

Early life
Maravich was born to Peter "Press" Maravich (1915–1987) and Helen Gravor Maravich (1925–1974) in Aliquippa, a steel town in Beaver County in western Pennsylvania, near Pittsburgh. Maravich amazed his family and friends with his basketball abilities from an early age. He enjoyed a close but demanding father-son relationship that motivated him toward achievement and fame in the sport. Maravich's father was the son of Serbian immigrants and a professional player–turned-coach. He showed his son the fundamentals starting when Pete was seven years old. Obsessively, young Maravich spent hours practicing ball control tricks, passes, head fakes, and long-range shots.

Maravich played high school varsity ball at Daniel High School in Central, South Carolina, a year before being old enough to attend the school.  While at Daniel from 1961 to 1963, Maravich participated in the school's first-ever game against a team from an all-black school. In 1963 his father departed from his position as head basketball coach at Clemson University and joined the coaching staff at North Carolina State University. While living in Raleigh, North Carolina, Maravich attended Needham B. Broughton High School, where his famous moniker was born. From his habit of shooting the ball from his side, as if holding a revolver, Maravich became known as "Pistol" Pete Maravich. He graduated from Broughton in 1965 and then attended Edwards Military Institute, where he averaged 33 points per game. Maravich never liked school and did not like Edwards Military Institute. It was known that Press Maravich was extremely protective of Maravich and would guard against any issue that might come up during his adolescence. Press threatened to shoot Maravich with a .45-caliber pistol if he drank or got into trouble. Maravich was 6 feet 4 inches in high school and was getting ready to play in college when his father took a coaching position at Louisiana State University.

College career
At that time NCAA rules prohibited first-year students from playing at varsity level, which forced Maravich to play on the freshman team. In his first game, Maravich put up 50 points, 14 rebounds and 11 assists against Southeastern Louisiana College.

In only three years playing on the varsity team (and under his father's coaching) at LSU, Maravich scored 3,667 points—1,138 of those in 1967–68, 1,148 in 1968–69, and 1,381 in 1969–70—while averaging 43.8, 44.2, and 44.5 points per game, respectively. For his collegiate career, the  guard averaged 44.2 points per game in 83 contests and led the NCAA in scoring for each of his three seasons.

Maravich's long-standing collegiate scoring record is particularly notable when three factors are taken into account:
First, because of the NCAA rules that prohibited him from taking part in varsity competition during his first year as a student, Maravich was prevented from adding to his career record for a full quarter of his time at LSU.  During this first year, Maravich scored 741 points in freshman competition.
Second, Maravich played before the advent of the three-point line. This significant difference has raised speculation regarding just how much higher his records would be, given his long-range shooting ability and how such a component might have altered his play. Writing for ESPN.com, Bob Carter stated, "Though Maravich played before [...] the 3-point shot was established, he loved gunning from long range." It has been reported that former LSU coach Dale Brown charted every shot Maravich scored and concluded that, if his shots from three-point range had been counted as three points, Maravich's average would have totaled 57 points per game and 12 three-pointers per game. 
Third, the shot clock had also not yet been instituted in NCAA play during Maravich's college career. (A time limit on ball possession speeds up play, mandates an additional number of field goal attempts, eliminates stalling, and increases the number of possessions throughout the game, all resulting in higher overall scoring.)

More than 50 years later, however, many of his NCAA and LSU records still stand. Maravich was a three-time All-American. Though he never appeared in the NCAA tournament, Maravich played a key role in turning around a lackluster program that had posted a 3–20 record in the season prior to his arrival. Maravich finished his college career in the 1970 National Invitation Tournament, where LSU finished fourth.

NCAA career statistics

Freshman
At this time, freshmen did not play on the varsity team and these stats do not count in the NCAA record books.

|-
| style="text-align:left;"| 1966–67
| style="text-align:left;"| Louisiana State
| 19 || 19 || ... || .452 || ... || .833 || 10.4 || ... || ... || ... || 43.6

Varsity

|-
| style="text-align:left;"| 1967–68
| style="text-align:left;"| Louisiana State
| 26 || 26 || ... || .423 || ... || .811 || 7.5 || 4.0 || ... || ... || 43.8
|-
| style="text-align:left;"| 1968–69
| style="text-align:left;"| Louisiana State
| 26 || 26 || ... || .444 || ... || .746 || 6.5 || 4.9 || ... || ... || 44.2
|-
| style="text-align:left;"| 1969–70
| style="text-align:left;"| Louisiana State
| 31 || 31 || ... || .447 || ... || .773 || 5.3 || 6.2 || ... || ... || 44.5
|-
| style="text-align:left;" colspan=2|Career
| 83 || 83 || ... || .438 || ... || .775 || 6.5 || 5.1 || ... || ... || 44.2

Professional basketball career

Atlanta Hawks

The Atlanta Hawks selected Maravich with the third pick in the first round of the 1970 NBA draft, where he played for coach Richie Guerin.  He was not a natural fit in Atlanta, as the Hawks already boasted a top-notch scorer at the guard position in combo guard Lou Hudson.  In fact, Maravich's flamboyant style stood in stark contrast to the conservative play of Hudson and star center Walt Bellamy.  It also did not help that many of the veteran players resented the $1.9 million contract that Maravich received from the team—a very large salary at that time.

Maravich appeared in 81 games and averaged 23.2 points per contest—good enough to earn NBA All-Rookie Team honors. He managed to blend his style with his teammates, so much so that Hudson set a career high by scoring 26.8 points per game.  But the team stumbled to a 36–46 record—12 wins fewer than in the previous season.  Still, the Hawks qualified for the playoffs, where they lost to the New York Knicks during the first round, as Maravich averaged 22 points a contest in the five game series.

Maravich struggled somewhat during his second season. His scoring average dipped to 19.3 points per game, and the Hawks finished with another disappointing 36–46 record.  Once again they qualified for the playoffs, and once again they were eliminated in the first round.  However, Atlanta fought hard against the Boston Celtics, with Maravich averaging 27.7 points in the series.

Maravich erupted in his third season, averaging 26.1 points (5th in the NBA) and dishing out 6.9 assists per game (6th in the NBA).  With 2,063 points, he combined with Hudson (2,029 points) to become only the second set of teammates in league history to each score over 2,000 points in a single season. The Hawks soared to a 46–36 record, but again bowed out in the first round of the playoffs. However, the season was good enough to earn Maravich his first-ever appearance in the NBA All-Star Game, and also All-NBA Second Team honors.

The following season (1973–74) was his best yet—at least in terms of individual accomplishments. Maravich posted 27.7 points per game—second in the league behind Bob McAdoo—and earned his second appearance in the All-Star Game, where he would start for the Eastern Conference and score 15 points. However, Atlanta sank to a disappointing 35–47 record and missed the postseason entirely.

New Orleans Jazz
In the summer of 1974, an expansion franchise was preparing for its first season of competition in the NBA.  The New Orleans Jazz were looking for something or someone to generate excitement among their new basketball fans. With his exciting style of play, Maravich was seen as the perfect man for the job. Additionally, he was already a celebrity in the state due to his accomplishments at LSU.  To acquire Maravich, the Jazz traded two players and four draft picks to Atlanta.

The expansion team struggled mightily in its first season.  Maravich managed to score 21.5 points per game, but shot a career-worst 41.9 percent from the floor. The Jazz posted a 23–59 record, worst in the NBA.

Jazz management did its best to give Maravich a better supporting cast. The team posted a 38–44 record in its second season (1975–76) but did not qualify for postseason play despite the dramatic improvement.  Maravich struggled with injuries that limited him to just 62 games that season, but he averaged 25.9 points per contest (third behind McAdoo and Kareem Abdul-Jabbar) and continued his crowd-pleasing antics. He was elected to the All-NBA First Team that year.

The following season (1976–77) was his most productive in the NBA.  He led the league in scoring with an average of 31.1 points per game.  He scored 40 points or more in 13 games, and 50 or more in four games. His 68-point masterpiece against the Knicks was at the time the most points ever scored by a guard in a single game, and only two players at any position had ever scored more: Wilt Chamberlain and Elgin Baylor. Baylor was head coach of the Jazz at that time. Despite Maravich's performance, the team finished at 35-47 (three wins shy of the previous season) and once again failed to make the playoffs.

Maravich earned his third All-Star game appearance and was honored as All-NBA First Team for the second consecutive season.

The following season, injuries to both knees forced him to miss 32 games during the 1977–78 season. Despite being robbed of some quickness and athleticism, he still managed to score 27.0 points per game, and he also added 6.7 assists per contest, his highest average as a member of the Jazz.  Many of those assists went to new teammate Truck Robinson, who had joined the franchise as a free agent during the off-season. In Robinson's first year in New Orleans, Robinson averaged 22.7 points and a league-best 15.7 rebounds per game. Robinson's presence prevented opponents from focusing their defensive efforts entirely on Maravich, and it lifted the Jazz to a 39–43 record—just short of making the club's first-ever appearance in the playoffs.

Knee problems plagued Maravich for the rest of his career. He played in just 49 games during the 1978–79 season. He scored 22.6 points per game that season and earned his fifth and final All-Star appearance. But his scoring and passing abilities were severely impaired. The team struggled on the court, and faced serious financial trouble as well. Management became desperate to make some changes. The Jazz traded Robinson to the Phoenix Suns, receiving draft picks and some cash in return. However, in 1979, team owner Sam Battistone moved the Jazz to Salt Lake City.

Final season
The Utah Jazz began play in the 1979–80 season.  Maravich moved with the team to Salt Lake City, but his knee problems were worse than ever.  He appeared in 17 games early in the season, but his injuries prevented him from practicing much, and new coach Tom Nissalke had a strict rule that players who didn't practice were not allowed to play in games.  Thus, Maravich was parked on the bench for 24 straight games, much to the dismay of Utah fans and to Maravich himself.  During that time, Adrian Dantley emerged as the team's franchise player.

The Jazz placed Maravich on waivers in January 1980.  He signed with the Celtics, the top team in the league that year, led by rookie superstar Larry Bird.  Maravich adjusted to a new role as part-time contributor, giving Boston a "hired gun" on offense off the bench. He helped the team post a 61–21 record in the regular season, the best in the league.  And, for the first time since his early career in Atlanta, Maravich was able to participate in the NBA playoffs.  He appeared in nine games during that postseason, but the Celtics were upended by Julius Erving and the Philadelphia 76ers in the Eastern Conference finals, four games to one.

Realizing that his knee problems would never go away, Maravich retired at the end of that season. The NBA instituted the 3-point shot just in time for Maravich's last season in the league. He had always been famous for his long-range shooting, and though injury-dampened, his final year provided an official statistical gauge of his abilities. Between his limited playing time in Utah and Boston, he made 10 of 15 3-point shots, giving him a career 66.7% completion rate.

During his ten-year career in the NBA, Maravich played in 658 games, averaging 24.2 points and 5.4 assists per contest.  In 1987, he was inducted into the Naismith Memorial Basketball Hall of Fame, and his No. 7 jersey has been retired by both the Jazz and the New Orleans Pelicans, as well as his No. 44 jersey by the Atlanta Hawks. In 2021, to commemorate the NBA's 75th Anniversary The Athletic ranked their top 75 players of all time, and named Maravich as the 73rd greatest player in NBA history.

NBA career statistics

Regular season

|-
| style="text-align:left;"| 1970–71
| style="text-align:left;"| Atlanta
| 81 || ... || 36.1 || .458 || ... || .800 || 3.7 || 4.4 || ... || ... || 23.2
|-
| style="text-align:left;"| 1971–72
| style="text-align:left;"| Atlanta
| 66 || ... || 34.9 || .427 || ... || .811 || 3.9 || 6.0 || ... || ... || 19.3
|-
| style="text-align:left;"| 1972–73
| style="text-align:left;"| Atlanta
| 79 || ... || 39.1 || .441 || ... || .800 || 4.4 || 6.9 || ... || ... || 26.1
|-
| style="text-align:left;"| 1973–74
| style="text-align:left;"| Atlanta
| 76 || ... || 38.2 || .457 || ... || .826 || 4.9 || 5.2 || 1.5 || .2 || 27.7
|-
| style="text-align:left;"| 1974–75
| style="text-align:left;"| New Orleans
| 79 || ... || 36.1 || .419 || ... || .811 || 5.3 || 6.2 || 1.5 || .2 || 21.5
|-
| style="text-align:left;"| 1975–76
| style="text-align:left;"| New Orleans
| 62 || ... || 38.3 || .459|| ... || .811 || 4.8 || 5.4 || 1.4 || .4 || 25.9
|-
| style="text-align:left;"| 1976–77
| style="text-align:left;"| New Orleans
| 73 || ... || 41.7 || .433 || ... || .835 || 5.1 || 5.4 || 1.2 || .3 ||style="background:#cfecec;"|  31.1*
|-
| style="text-align:left;"| 1977–78
| style="text-align:left;"| New Orleans
| 50 || ... || 40.8 || .444 || ... || .870 || 3.6 || 6.7 || 2.0 || .2 || 27.0
|-
| style="text-align:left;"| 1978–79
| style="text-align:left;"| New Orleans
| 49 || ... || 37.2 || .421 || ... || .841 || 2.5 || 5.0 || 1.2 || .4 || 22.6
|-
| style="text-align:left;"| 1979–80
| style="text-align:left;"| Utah
| 17 || ... || 30.7 || .412 || .636 || .820 || 2.4 || 3.2 || .9 || .2 || 17.1
|-
| style="text-align:left;"| 1979–80
| style="text-align:left;"| Boston
| 26 || 4 || 17.0 || .494 || .750 ||.909 || 1.5 || 1.1 || .3 || .1 || 11.5
|- class="sortbottom"
| style="text-align:center;" colspan="2"| Career
| 658 || ... || 37.0 || .441 || .667 || .820 || 4.2 || 5.4 || 1.4 || .3 || 24.2
|- class="sortbottom"
| style="text-align:center;" colspan="2"| All-Star
| 4 || 4 || 19.8 || .409 || ... || .778 || 2.0 || 3.8 || 1.0 || 0.0 || 10.8

Playoffs

|-
| style="text-align:left;"| 1971
| style="text-align:left;"| Atlanta
| 5 || ... || 39.8 || .377 || ... || .692 || 5.2 || 4.8 || ... || ... || 22.0
|-
| style="text-align:left;"| 1972
| style="text-align:left;"| Atlanta
| 6 || ... || 36.5 || .446 || ... || .817 || 5.3 || 4.7 || ... || ... || 27.7
|-
| style="text-align:left;"| 1973
| style="text-align:left;"| Atlanta
| 6 || ... || 39.0 || .419 || ... || .794 || 4.8 || 6.7 || ... || ... || 26.2
|-
| style="text-align:left;"| 1980
| style="text-align:left;"| Boston
| 9 || ... || 11.6 || .490 || .333 || .667 || .9 || .7 || .3 || .0 || 6.0
|-
| style="text-align:center;" colspan=2|Career
| 26 || ... || 29.1 || .423 || .333 || .784 || 3.6 || 3.8 || .3 || .0 || 18.7
|-

Later life and death
After injuries forced his retirement from the game in late 1980, Maravich became a recluse for two years. Through it all, Maravich said he was searching "for life". He tried the practices of yoga and Hinduism, read Trappist monk Thomas Merton's The Seven Storey Mountain and took an interest in the field of ufology, the study of unidentified flying objects. He also explored vegetarianism and macrobiotics, adopting a vegetarian diet in 1982.  Eventually, he became a born-again Christian, embracing evangelical Christianity.  A few years before his death, Maravich said, "I want to be remembered as a Christian, a person that serves Him [Jesus] to the utmost, not as a basketball player."

On January 5, 1988, Maravich collapsed and died of heart failure at age 40 while playing in a pickup basketball game in the gym at First Church of the Nazarene in Pasadena, California, with a group that included evangelical author James Dobson. Maravich had flown out from his home in Covington, Louisiana to tape a segment for Dobson's radio show that aired later that day. Dobson has said that Maravich's last words, less than a minute before he died, were "I feel great." An autopsy revealed the cause of death to be a rare congenital defect; he had been born with a missing left coronary artery, a vessel that supplies blood to the muscle fibers of the heart. His right coronary artery was grossly enlarged and had been compensating for the defect.

Legacy
Maravich was survived by his wife Jackie and his sons Jaeson, who was 8 years old at the time of his death, and Josh, aged 5.

Since Maravich's children were very young when he died, Jackie Maravich initially shielded them from unwanted media attention, not even allowing Jaeson and Josh to attend their father's funeral. However, his sons still developed a love for the game. During a 2003 interview, Jaeson told USA Today that, when he was still only a toddler, "My dad passed me a (Nerf) basketball, and I've been hooked ever since ...  My dad said I shot and missed, and I got mad and I kept shooting. He said his dad told him he did the same thing."

Despite some setbacks coping with their father's death and without the benefit that his tutelage might have provided, both sons eventually were inspired to play high school and collegiate basketball—Josh at his father's alma mater, LSU.

On June 27, 2014, Louisiana governor Bobby Jindal proposed that LSU erect a statue of Maravich outside the Pete Maravich Assembly Center. Maravich's widow, Jackie McLachlan, said that she had been promised a statue after the passing of her husband. Others opposed a Maravich statue because he had fallen a few credits short of graduation and therefore didn't meet the requirements for monuments to student-athletes.

In February 2016, the LSU Athletic Hall of Fame Committee unanimously approved a proposal that a statue honoring Maravich be installed on the campus, revising the stipulations required. On July 25, 2022, the statue was unveiled to the public outside of the Assembly Center.

Memorabilia
Maravich's untimely death and mystique have made memorabilia associated with him among the most highly prized of any basketball collectibles. Game-used Maravich jerseys bring more money at auction than similar items from anybody other than George Mikan, with the most common items selling for $10,000 and up and a game-used LSU jersey selling for $94,300 in a 2001 Grey Flannel auction. The signed game ball from his career-high 68-point night on February 25, 1977, sold for $131,450 in a 2009 Heritage auction.

Honors, books, films and music
In 1970, during his LSU days, Acapulco Music/The Panama Limited released "The Ballad of Pete Maravich by Bob Tinney and Woody Jenkins. 
In 1987, roughly a year before his death, Maravich co-authored Heir to a Dream, an award-winning (Gold Medallion) autobiography, with Darrel Campbell. It devotes considerable focus to his life after retirement from basketball and his later devotion to Christianity. 
In 1987, Maravich and Darrel Campbell produced the four-episode basketball instructional video series Pistol Pete's Homework Basketball. 
In 1988, Frank Schroeder and Darrel Campbell produced the documentary Maravich Memories: The LSU Years, based on Pete Maravich's college career. 
After Maravich's death, Louisiana Governor Buddy Roemer signed a proclamation officially renaming LSU's basketball court the Pete Maravich Assembly Center.
In 1991, The Pistol: The Birth of a Legend, a biographical film written and produced by Darrel Campbell dramatizing his 8th-grade season, was released.
In 1996, Maravich was named one of the 50 Greatest Players in NBA History by a panel made up of NBA historians, players, and coaches. He was the only deceased player on the list. At the ceremony during halftime for 1997 All-Star Game in Cleveland, he was represented by his two sons.
In 2001, a comprehensive 90-minute documentary film, Pistol Pete: The Life and Times of Pete Maravich, debuted on CBS.
In 2005, ESPNU named Maravich the greatest college basketball player of all time.
In 2007, two biographies of Maravich were released: Maravich by Wayne Federman and Marshall Terrill; and Pistol by Mark Kriegel. Also in 2007, to promote Kriegel's book, Fox Sports conducted a contest to find "Pete Maravich's Biggest Fan". The winner was Scott Pollack of Sunrise, Florida.
In 2021, Maravich was named one of the members of the NBA 75th Anniversary Team by a panel made up of NBA historians, players and coaches. 
 The Ziggens, a band from Southern California, wrote "Pistol Pete", a song about Maravich.

Collegiate awards

 The Sporting News College Player of the Year (1970)
 USBWA College Player of the Year (1969, 1970)
 Naismith Award Winner (1970)
 Helms Foundation Player of the Year (1970)
 UPI Player of the Year (1970)
 Sporting News Player of the Year (1970)
 AP College Player of the Year (1970)
 The Sporting News All-America First Team (1968, 1969, 1970)
 Three-time AP and UPI First-Team All-America (1968, 1969, 1970)
 Led the NCAA Division I in scoring with 43.8 ppg (1968); 44.2 (1969) and 44.5 ppg (1970)
 Averaged 43.6 ppg on the LSU freshman team (1967)
 Scored a career-high 69 points vs. Alabama; 66 vs. Tulane; 64 vs. Kentucky; 61 vs. Vanderbilt
 Holds LSU records for most field goals made (26) and attempted (57) in a game against Vanderbilt on 
 All-Southeastern Conference (1968, 1969, 1970)
 #23 Jersey retired by LSU (2007)
 In 1970, Maravich led LSU to a 20–8 record and a fourth-place finish in the National Invitation Tournament

Collegiate records

 Points, career: 3,667 (three seasons)
 Highest scoring average, points per game, career: 44.2 (3,667 points/83 games)
 Points, season: 1,381 (1970)
 Highest scoring average, points per game, season: 44.5 (1,381/31) (1970)
 Games scoring 50 or more points, career: 28
 Games scoring 50 or more points, season: 10 (1970)
 Field goals made, career: 1,387
 Field goals made, season: 522 (1970)
 Field goal attempts, career: 3,166
 Field goal attempts, season: 1,168 (1970)
 Free throws made, game: 30 (in 31 attempts), vs. Oregon State,  
Tied by Ben Woodside, North Dakota State, on

NBA awards

NBA All-Rookie Team
All-NBA First Team (1976, 1977)
All-NBA Second Team (1973, 1978)
Five-time NBA All-Star (1973, 1974, 1977, 1978, 1979)
Led the league in scoring (31.1 ppg) in 1977, his career best
Scored a career-high 68 points against the New York Knicks on February 25, 1977
#7 jersey retired by the Utah Jazz (1985)
#7 jersey retired by the Superdome (1988)
NBA 50th Anniversary All-Time Team (1996)
 NBA 75th Anniversary Team (2021)
#7 jersey retired by the New Orleans Hornets (now Pelicans) (2002), even though he never played for them—one of only four players to have a number retired by a team they did not play for; Maravich did play professionally for the New Orleans Jazz, however, and has remained a greatly admired figure amongst New Orleans sports fans ever since.
#44 jersey retired by the Atlanta Hawks (2017)

NBA records
Free throws made, quarter: 14, Pete Maravich, third quarter, Atlanta Hawks vs. Buffalo Braves, 
Broken by Vince Carter on 

Free throw attempts, quarter: 16, Pete Maravich, second quarter, Atlanta Hawks at Chicago Bulls, 
Broken by Ben Wallace on 

Second pair of teammates in NBA history to score 2,000 or more points in a season: 2, Atlanta Hawks 
Maravich: 2,063 
Lou Hudson: 2,029

Third pair of teammates in NBA history to score 40 or more points in the same game: New Orleans Jazz vs. Denver Nuggets,  
Maravich: 45 
Nate Williams: 41 
David Thompson of the Denver Nuggets also scored 40 points in this game.

Ranks 4th in NBA history – Free throws made, none missed, game: 18–18, Pete Maravich, Atlanta Hawks vs. Buffalo Braves, 

Ranks 5th in NBA history – Free throws made, game: 23, Pete Maravich, New Orleans Jazz vs. New York Knicks,  (2 OT)

See also
List of individual National Basketball Association scoring leaders by season
List of National Basketball Association players with most points in a game
List of National Basketball Association top rookie scoring averages
List of NCAA Division I men's basketball players with 60 or more points in a game
List of NCAA Division I men's basketball season scoring leaders
List of NCAA Division I men's basketball career scoring leaders
List of NCAA Division I men's basketball career free throw scoring leaders
List of National Basketball Association annual minutes leaders

Further reading
 Campbell, Darrel (2019). Hero & Friend: My Days with Pistol Pete. Percussion Films. .

Brown, Danny (2008). Shooting the Pistol: Courtside Photographs of Pete Maravich at LSU. Louisiana State University Press

Notes

References

External links

Pete Maravich biography at NBA.com
Pete Maravich at ESPN

Pete Maravich's Greatest Achievement at powertochange.ie
‘68 All College MVP - 4 Days with Pistol Pete at oklahoman.com

Pete Maravich Bio LSU Tigers Athletics 

1947 births
1988 deaths
All-American college men's basketball players
American evangelicals
American men's basketball players
American people of Serbian descent
Atlanta Hawks draft picks
Atlanta Hawks players
Basketball players from Pennsylvania
Boston Celtics players
College basketball announcers in the United States
LSU Tigers basketball players
Naismith Memorial Basketball Hall of Fame inductees
National Basketball Association All-Stars
National Basketball Association broadcasters
National Basketball Association players with retired numbers
Needham B. Broughton High School alumni
New Orleans Jazz players
Parade High School All-Americans (boys' basketball)
People from Aliquippa, Pennsylvania
Shooting guards
Sportspeople from the Pittsburgh metropolitan area
Basketball players from Raleigh, North Carolina
Utah Jazz players